About the Son is a 1921 German silent drama film directed by Frederik Larsen and starring Carola Toelle, Ernst Hofmann and Ernst Stahl-Nachbaur. It premiered in Berlin on 13 May 1921.

Cast
 Carola Toelle as Die Sekretärin
 Ernst Hofmann
 Ernst Stahl-Nachbaur
 Frida Richard
 Harry Berber
 Julius Brandt
 Ilka Grüning
 Hedda Kemp
 Albert Patry
 Charles Puffy
 Max Ruhbeck
 Robert Scholz
 Emmy Sturm
 Paul Westermeier
 Mary Zucker

References

Bibliography

External links

1921 films
Films of the Weimar Republic
German silent feature films
German drama films
1921 drama films
Films produced by Erich Pommer
German black-and-white films
1920s German-language films
Silent drama films
1920s German films